Browns Creek is a  long 2nd order tributary to the Cape Fear River in Bladen County, North Carolina.

Course
Browns Creek rises in Sheriff White Pond, a Carolina Bay, about 1 mile southeast of Dublin, North Carolina.  Browns Creek then flows southeast and east through the south side of Elizabethtown to join the Cape Fear River about 1.5 miles east of Elizabethtown, North Carolina.

Watershed
Browns Creek drains  of area, receives about 49.2 in/year of precipitation, has a wetness index of 561.30 and is about 21% forested.

See also
List of rivers of North Carolina

References

Rivers of North Carolina
Rivers of Bladen County, North Carolina
Tributaries of the Cape Fear River